Harry Lee Poe (born 1950) is an American academic. He is the Charles Colson Chair of Faith and Culture at Union University in Jackson, Tennessee, and author of a number of books.

He is a relative of the family of Edgar Allan Poe and president of the Poe Foundation. He was the director of the Poe writers conference in 2007.

His book Edgar Allan Poe: An Illustrated Companion to His Tell-Tale Stories won the Edgar Award for 2009 in the category best critical/biographical. The same book received an Agatha nomination for best non-fiction book.

Bibliography
 The Fruit of Christ's Presence (1990) 
 The Gospel and Its Meaning: A Theology for Evangelism and Church Growth (1996) 
 Science and Faith: An Evangelical Dialogue [Co-author] (2000)  
 Christian Witness in a Postmodern World (2001) 
 Designer Universe: Intelligent Design and the Existence of God [Co-authored with  Jimmy H Davis] (2002) 
 Christianity in the Academy: Teaching at the Intersection of Faith and Learning (2004) 
 C. S. Lewis Remembered: Collected Reflections of Students, Friends & Colleagues 
 See No Evil: The Existence of Sin in an Age of Relativism (2004) 
 What God Knows: Time and the Question of Divine Knowledge (2005) 
 Meditations on the good, the true, and the beautiful (2008) 
 The Inklings of Oxford : a pictorial account (2008) 
 Chance or dance : an evaluation of design (2008) 
 Edgar Allan Poe: An Illustrated Companion to His Tell-Tale Stories (2008)  NOTE: This title won the 2009 Edgar award in the category best critical/biographical.
 God and the Cosmos: Divine Activity in Space, Time and History [co-authored with Jimmy H Davis] (2012) 
 Evermore: Edgar Allan Poe and the Mystery of the Universe (2012)

References

External links 
 Zondervan author page
 Faculty page at Union University

Christian writers
Living people
Edgar Allan Poe scholars
Edgar Allan Poe
University of South Carolina alumni
Union University
Southern Baptist Theological Seminary alumni
1950 births